Lakhimpur district is an administrative district in the state of Assam in India. The district headquarter is located at North Lakhimpur. The district is bounded on the North by Siang and Papumpare districts of Arunachal Pradesh and on the East by Dhemaji District and Subansiri River. Majuli District stands on the Southern side and Biswanath District is on the West.

Etymology 
The name Lakhimpur was derived from the name "Lakshmipur" which was given by the Sutiya king named Lakshminarayan who ruled during the 15th century. Later, it was changed by the Baro-Bhuyans to Lakhimpur, when they were made feudal lords of the region by the Ahoms after defeating the Sutiya kings and was kept in memory of the land (in present-day Darrang district), which they lost to the Koch kingdom.

History 
Lakhimpur figures largely in the annals of Assam as the region where tribes from the east first reached the Brahmaputra. The most prominent of them was the Chutiya rulers who held the areas of the present district for long, until the outbreak of the Ahom-Chutiya conflict in the 16th century and eventually the area came under the rule of the Ahom dynasty. The Ahoms created a new position called Bhatialia Gohain to control the region. The area was later given by Ahoms to the Baro-Bhuyans to rule like feudal lords, as they had helped defeat the Chutiya and Kachari kingdoms. There was a Chutia principality formed by the king Lakshminarayan in the start of the 15th century upon which the district has been named. The copperplate inscription of a land grant given by the Chutia king in the year 1403 CE in the west of the Subansiri river as well as the ruins between Dhal and Ghagar rivers (near present-day North Lakhimpur town) shows the evidence of the settlement. The Burmese, who had ruined the native kingdoms, at the end of the 18th century, was in 1826 expelled by the British under the Treaty of Yandabo. They placed the southern part of the state, together with Sivasagar under the rule of Purandar Singha; but it was not till 1838 that the whole was taken under direct British Administration.

Lakhimpur district used to have several other districts of Arunachal Pradesh within its fold and was known as the Lakhimpur Frontier Tract. After independence, the district contained the present day Dibrugarh district, Tinsukia district and Dhemaji district. Its headquarter was at Dibrugarh.

In 1971, Dibrugarh district was separated from Lakhimpur. This was repeated on 14 October 1989, with the formation of Dhemaji district.

Geography

Located in the North-East corner of the Indian State of Assam, the district of Lakhimpur lies on the North bank of the river Brahmaputra. It is bounded on the North by Lower Subansiri and Papumpare Districts of the state of Arunachal Pradesh and on the East by Dhemaji District. Majuli, the largest river-island district is on the South and Biswanath District is on the West. The Brahmaputra is navigable for steamers in all seasons as far as Dibrugarh, in the rainy season as far as Sadiya; its navigable tributaries within the district are the Subansiri River, Ranganadi, and Dikrong River. The exact location of the district is 26.48’ and 27.53’ Northern latitude and 93.42’ and 94.20' East longitude (approx.).

The district has three sub divisions -- Dhakuakhana, Narayanpur-Bihpuria and North Lakhimpur (sadar). Lakhimpur district has eight Police stations. viz. North Lakhimpur, Boginadi, Panigaon, Dhakuakhana, Ghilamara, Narayanpur, Laluk and Bihpuria.

Forests are mainly tropical rain forest. Important reserved forests includes Ranga Reserve, Kakoi Reserve, Dulung Reserve and Pabho Reserve. Some varieties are Hollokh (Terminalia myriocarpa), Ajhar (Lagerstroemia speciosa), Simolu (Bombax ceiba or Salmalia malabarica), Sum (Machilus), Gomari (Gmelina arborea), Sisu (Dalbergia sissoo), Silikha (Terminalia chebula), Neem (Azadirachta indica), Nahar (Mesua ferrea) etc. Wild elephants, buffaloes, tigers, deer etc. are there in the forests. Varieties of bird species are observed in swampy areas.

The great Subansiri River has legends of once famous gold washing. But as of now, there is no any major exploration of minerals in the district, except some minor exploration for petroleum by the Oil and Natural Gas Corporation (ONGC) near Dhakuakhana.

Economy
The economy of Lakhimpur is mainly based on agriculture. Major crops are rice, tea, mustard, sugarcane, etc. A small number of SSc and MSc industries are located in the district.

Divisions
There are four Assam Legislative Assembly constituencies in this district: Bihpuria, Naoboicha, Lakhimpur, and Dhakuakhana. Dhakuakhana is designated for scheduled tribes. Bihpuria is in the Tezpur Lok Sabha constituency, whilst the other three are in the Lakhimpur Lok Sabha constituency.

Demographics

According to the 2011 census Lakhimpur district has a population of 1,042,137, roughly equal to the nation of Cyprus or the US state of Rhode Island. This gives it a ranking of 435th in India (out of a total of 640). Its population growth rate over the decade 2001-2011 was 17.06%. Lakhimpur has a sex ratio of 965 females for every 1000 males, and a literacy rate of 78.39%. Scheduled Castes and Tribes make up 7.85% and 23.93% of the population respectively.

Religion

Hindus are 76.49%, Muslims are 18.57% and Christians are 4.43% of the population.

Languages

At the time of the 2011 census, 57.8% of the population spoke Assamese, 17.64% Mishing, 12.96% Bengali, 2.46% Sadri, 2.35% Nepali, 1.21% Deori and 1.17% Hindi as their first language.

Flora and fauna
It shares the park with Dhemaji district.

See also
 Lakhimpur (Lok Sabha constituency)
 Latabari

References

 
 Official site

External links

 District Administration website
 

 
Districts of Assam
1838 establishments in British India